The third season of the British-American animated sitcom The Amazing World of Gumball, created by Ben Bocquelet, aired on Cartoon Network in the United States and was produced by Cartoon Network Development Studio Europe. The season has 40 episodes. The series focuses on the misadventures of Gumball Watterson, a blue 12-year-old cat, along with his adopted brother, Darwin, a goldfish. Together, they cause mischief among their family, as well as with the wide array of students at Elmore Junior High, where they attend middle school.

Development

Plot
The season focuses on the misadventures of Gumball Watterson, a blue 12-year-old cat, along with his adopted brother, Darwin, a goldfish. Together, they cause mischief among their family, as well as with the wide array of students at Elmore Junior High, where they attend middle school. In a behind-the-scenes video documenting the production of the second season, creator Ben Bocquelet expanded on the development of some of the characters, and how they are based on interactions from his childhood.

Production
The third season began filming on December 5, 2013, and ended filming on February 5, 2015. In October 2012, Cartoon Network announced that The Amazing World of Gumball had been renewed for a third season consisting of 40 episodes. The season was written by Bocquelet, Guillaume Cassuto, Mic Graves, Tobi Wilson, Jess Ransom, Howard Read, Ben Cottam, Paul McKenna, Kieran Hodgson, Tom Meltzer, Joe Parham, Tim Allsop, Stewart Williams, Paul Rice, Jon Foster, James Lamont, Tony Hull, Richard Overall, Louise Coats, Timothy Mills, and Richard Preddy, and was storyboarded by Aurelie Charbonnier, Akis Dimitrakopoulos, Adrian Maganza, Andy Kelly, Chuck Klein, and Wandrille Maunoury. The season marks the debut of series voice actors Jacob Hopkins and Terrell Ransom, Jr., who take over the roles of Gumball and Darwin from Logan Grove and Kwesi Boakye at the end of this first episode "The Kids", which also introduced Hopkins and Ransom.

Broadcast
The season premiered on Cartoon Network in the United Kingdom and Ireland in September 2014. This season had 1.937 million viewers per episode in the United States.

Episodes

Notes

References

2014 American television seasons
2014 British television seasons
2015 American television seasons
2015 British television seasons
3